The Sustainable Fisheries Act of 1996 is an amendment to the Magnuson-Stevens Fishery Conservation and Management Act, a law governing the management of marine fisheries in the United States. Another major amendment to this legislation was later made under the Magnuson-Stevens Fishery Conservation and Management Reauthorization Act of 2006. The SFA was enacted to amend the outdated MSFCMA of 1976. The amendment included changes to the purpose of the act, definitions, and international affairs, as well as many small changes.

The U.S. Senate bill S. 39 was passed by the 104th United States Congressional session and enacted into law by the 42nd President of the United States Bill Clinton on October 11, 1996.

Purpose
There were several major changes to the purpose of the law: 
 Prohibiting fisheries managers from using social, economic, or any other justifications to allow catch targets to exceed a calculated "maximum sustainable yield."
 Mandating that for each managed species, fisheries managers quantitatively define "overfishing" (certain specified maximum allowed rates of fishing mortality) and "overfished" (depletion below a certain population level).
 Mandating regular assessment of which fish populations that are overfished, and creating an official list of overfished species in U.S. waters.
 Mandating that for overfished species, plans must be enacted allowing them to recover to quantitatively specified target population levels (usually about one-third of the estimated pre-fishing population) within ten years (with certain exceptions).
 Adding that catches of unintended species or unmarketable fish be reduced, to the extent practicable.
 Adding the promotion of protection of "Essential Fish Habitat."
 Adding the promotion of catch and release programs to conservation and management principles.

Definitions
The following terms which became relevant in the twenty years following the original act were added:
 bycatch
 charter fishing
 commercial fishing
 economic discards
 essential fish habitat
 fishing community
 individual fishing quota
 optimum yield
 overfishing (overfished)
 Pacific Insular Area
 recreational fishing
 regulatory discards
 special areas
 vessel subject to the jurisdiction of the United States

International affairs
Besides establishing the Pacific Insular Area fishery agreement regulations, the SFA directs the Secretary of State to "seek to secure an international agreement to establish standards and measures for bycatch reduction that are comparable to the standards and measures applicable to United States fishermen."

References

External links
 U.S. Public Law 104-297 http://www.nmfs.noaa.gov/sfa/sustainable_fishereries_act.pdf
 16 U.S.C. §§ 1801-1884 https://www.law.cornell.edu/uscode/usc_sec_16_00001801000-.html

Acts of the 104th United States Congress
1996 in the environment
Fish conservation
United States federal environmental legislation
Fisheries law